Central Asset Management Companywhich has been established under article 2 SPVs activities instruction approved by high council of stock exchange in August 2010. The main goals of this company are: establishment and management of SPVs, under paragraph "d" Matter of Law "the development of new financial instrument & institution in order to facilitate the implementation of forty –four constitution".

Objectives
Central Asset Management Company embarks on establishing SPVs (Limited Corporations) in order to use them with regard to the process of issuance of securities. In fact, Central Asset Management Company acts as a trustee in Iran Capital Market that constantly reviews and comments on the consumption of funds, maintenance of accounts, financial statements, and performance of the issuer according to the signed contract in order to maintain the interests of the owners of securities and gain assurance about the accuracy of issuer's activities. Among other responsibilities of this corporation is to do all administrative, financial, managerial, legal and lawful responsibilities of an SPV, maintain the accounts and financial books of the institution and rejecting them after the end of the contract.

References

Investment companies of Iran